The Workers' Revolutionary Organisation (in Spanish: Organización Revolucionaria de los Trabajadores) was a Maoist communist organisation in Spain. The newspaper of the organization was En Lucha.

History
ORT was founded in 1969, emerging out of the left-wing Catholic Workers' Trade Union Action (Acción Sindical de Trabajadores).

The youth wing of ORT was the Maoist Youth Union (Unión de Juventudes Maoístas) and the trade union wing was the Unitary Trade Union (Sindicato Unitario). ORT published En Lucha.

In the 1977 elections, ORT launched the Workers' Electoral Grouping (Agrupación Electoral de los Trabajadores). In 1979, ORT merged with the Party of Labour of Spain and formed the Workers' Party (PT).

References

 MOLINA BLÁZQUEZ, José. Apuntes para: orígenes y evolución de la Organización Revolucionaria de Trabajadores. 2009.

External links
Page in memory of the ORT

Political parties established in 1969
Political parties disestablished in 1979
Communist parties in Spain
Maoist organizations in Europe
Defunct political parties in Spain
Defunct communist parties
Anti-Francoism